"Third Rate Romance" is a song written by Russell Smith, first recorded in Montreal in 1974 by Jesse Winchester and his band the Rhythm Aces, assisted by Smith. It became a hit the following year by the newly re-formed Amazing Rhythm Aces on its 1975 album Stacked Deck. It was the band's debut single, reaching #11 on the U.S. country singles chart and #14 on the Billboard Hot 100, as well as #1 on the Canadian RPM Country Tracks and Top Singles charts.

Content
The third-person lyrics tell the story of a man and woman who meet at a restaurant and depart together for what presumably will prove to be a one-night stand at a motel (the "Family Inn"). At the door of the room, she nervously says, "I've never really done this kind of thing before—have you?" He admits that he has, "but only a time or two."

Chart performance

Weekly charts

Year-end charts

Sammy Kershaw version

American country music artist Sammy Kershaw covered the song on his 1994 album Feelin' Good Train, from which it was released as a single in 1994. It peaked at #2 in the United States country charts and at #10 in Canada. Russell Smith provided backing vocals on Kershaw's version.

Music video
The music video was directed by Michael Merriman, and premiered in late 1994. It features a woman luring an older man into going to a motel with her. She steals his money and watch and then drives off with another man, as the old man tries to chase them down.

Chart performance

Other versions
Jesse Winchester recorded the song on his 1974 album Learn to Love It.
Ace Spectrum recorded a more funky version of the song on their 1975 album Low Rent Rendezvous.
Elvis Costello recorded the song as a demo in 1975 on the album known as the "Flip City Demos"
Tom Jones recorded the song in 1976.
Rosanne Cash recorded the song on her 1982 album Somewhere in the Stars.
Fabulous Poodles recorded the song on their 1978 album Unsuitable.
Terry Rudenick recorded the song in 2019 on his EP The Road Is Long.
Another version was performed on The Earl Scruggs Review Anniversary Special  (1975).

References

1975 songs
Sammy Kershaw songs
1994 singles
The Amazing Rhythm Aces songs
1975 debut singles
RPM Top Singles number-one singles
Songs written by Russell Smith (singer)
Song recordings produced by Buddy Cannon
Song recordings produced by Norro Wilson
ABC Records singles
Mercury Records singles